The Shadow Throne may refer to:

The Shadow Throne, the third novel in the Ascendance Trilogy, a fantasy series by Jennifer A. Nielsen
The Shadow Throne, the second novel in the Shadow Campaigns series by Django Wexler
The Shadowthrone, the second studio album by Norwegian black metal band Satyricon